Edward S. Irish (May 6, 1905 – January 21, 1982) was an American basketball promoter and one of the key figures in popularizing professional basketball. He was the founder and president of the New York Knicks from 1946 to 1974. He was enshrined in the Naismith Memorial Basketball Hall of Fame in 1964.

Early life and career
Irish was born in Lake George, New York. His father died when he was three years old and his mother, a nurse, moved with him to Brooklyn, where he attended Erasmus Hall High School. He graduated from the University of Pennsylvania in 1928 and began working as a sports journalist for the New York World-Telegram. To supplement his income, in 1930 he began working in public relations for the New York Giants football team. That job led him to run the National Football League's information bureau during the 1930s.

Basketball
While at the World-Telegram, Irish covered basketball games in the small 500–1,000 seat gymnasiums of the day. He often told a story of covering a game at Manhattan College where the crowd so overwhelmed the tiny gym that he had to climb in through a window, tearing the pants of the best suit he owned. Whether the story was true or not, he told it often and it became associated with his drive to expand the game of basketball to meet the appetite of fans for it.

In 1934 he left the newspaper business to promote basketball games at Madison Square Garden. As this was during the Great Depression and the venue was often going unused, Irish was able to book events without putting up his own money so long as attendance at least covered the nightly rent. His promotions of college matchups were a larger financial success than anticipated, and were important to growing the popularity of basketball at a time before there was an established professional league. By 1946 the events had an average attendance of 18,196.

In 1946, he was one of the 11 founders of the Basketball Association of America, which merged with the National Basketball League three years later to become the National Basketball Association (the modern NBA). He insisted that home teams keep their own admissions revenue, which was advantageous to teams in major markets such as the Knicks. When the American Basketball Association was competing against the NBA in the late 1960s, he was an early advocate for merger, arguing that teams in rival leagues bidding for players would lead to contracts that couldn't be sustained by team revenues. The leagues merged in 1976.

Irish served as president of the Knicks from 1946 until 1974. He was mostly known as a hands-off president, as his skills lied in promotion rather than technical knowledge of the game. After initial coach Joe Lapchick left, Irish did take a more direct role but the team struggled. After Red Holzman became coach, Irish took a less active role again. Knicks analyst Alan Hahn wrote that Irish was not "beloved" and was known as cold and unapproachable.

Legacy
Irish was elected to the Basketball Hall of Fame in 1964.

References

External links
 Basketball Hall of Fame profile

1905 births
1982 deaths
Erasmus Hall High School alumni
Madison Square Garden
Naismith Memorial Basketball Hall of Fame inductees
National Basketball Association executives
New York Knicks executives
New York Knicks owners
People from Lake George, New York
20th-century American businesspeople